The Special Jury Prize is one of the main awards of the Feature Film Competition at the Karlovy Vary International Film Festival. It is the second highest award of the festival started since 1952; after the Crystal Globe.

Special Jury Prize Winners
1952-present

References

External links
  The official festival site / History

Karlovy Vary International Film Festival
Czech film awards
Lists of films by award
International film awards